The Rugby Challenge – known as the SuperSport Rugby Challenge for sponsorship reasons – is the secondary domestic rugby union competition in South Africa. The inaugural season of the competition was in 2017, set up as the long-term successor of the Vodacom Cup competition.

The competition is played at roughly the same time as Super Rugby each season, and features a combination of Super Rugby players returning from injury, reserve players attempting to maintain their fitness levels and younger players trying to break through to the Super Rugby or Currie Cup sides. It therefore serves as an important developmental competition for South African rugby.

Format

The sixteen teams are geographically divided into two sections – a North Section and a Southern Section. Each team would play the other teams in their section once during the regular season, either at home or away. Some fixtures were moved to a neutral venue as part of a "SuperStack" initiative, where three matches—including a local amateur club match—were played at one site, with free entry available at these festivals to help promote rugby amongst all social strata. The winner and runner-up of each section would qualify to the Quarter Finals, along with the two third-placed teams with the best records.

Teams

The teams that compete in the Rugby Challenge are:

Finals

The results of the finals played in the Rugby Challenge competition are as follows:

Overall record

The overall record for the teams in the Rugby Challenge competition is as follows:

Non-South African clubs

See also

 Currie Cup
 Vodacom Cup
 Bankfin Nite Series

References

 
Rugby union competitions for provincial teams
2017 establishments in South Africa
Recurring sporting events established in 2017
Professional sports leagues in South Africa